The Angelicall Stone is a concept in alchemy. According to Elias Ashmole the stone was the goal above all goals for the alchemist. In his prologue to the Theatrum Chemicum Britannicum, he states:

See also
Philosopher's Stone
Alchemy
Aether
Ambrosia

References

Alchemical concepts